Dying Light 2 Stay Human is a 2022 action role-playing game developed and published by Techland. The sequel to Dying Light (2015), the game was released on February 4, 2022 for PlayStation 4, PlayStation 5, Windows, Xbox One, and Xbox Series X/S. A Nintendo Switch version for the cloud is in development. The game received generally favorable reviews, with praise directed at the combat, parkour system, and open world, but criticism for the story. It sold 5 million units in its first month of release.

Gameplay 

Dying Light 2 Stay Human is an action role-playing survival horror video game featuring a zombie apocalyptic-themed open world. Set 22 years after Dying Light, it stars a new protagonist named Aiden Caldwell (voiced by Jonah Scott), who has various parkour skills. Players can perform actions such as climbing ledges, sliding, leaping off from edges, and wall running to quickly navigate the city. It was confirmed that there are over 3000 parkour animations to give a more fluid free running experience. Tools such as a grappling hook and a paraglider also aid traversal in the city. Aiden can also use the undead to break his fall. The game is mostly melee-based with the majority of fighting using melee weapons. The melee weapons have a limited lifespan and will degrade as the player uses them in combat. Long-range weapons such as crossbows, shotguns, and spears can be used as well. Weapons can be upgraded with different blueprints and components which can be found by breaking down weapons for craft parts. Aiden can utilize superhuman skills due to the infection. New zombies have been added. Like the first game, the zombies are slow when exposed to sunlight, but they become more aggressive and hostile at night. During the latter time of day, players can avoid zombies roaming the streets by staying on rooftops, who would otherwise hibernate inside buildings to avoid sunlight, or explore the safe interior of buildings to find items.

The game is set in the city of Villedor, a massive urban open world set in Europe that players can explore freely. The map, which is four times bigger than the first game, is broken into seven distinct regions and each has its own landmarks and locations. When exploring the city, players can scavenge for scrap and resources to craft new items and weapons. Players can activate windmills to attract survivors and merchants to set up settlements. As the player explores the city, they will find inhibitors, which can be used to increase Aiden's health or stamina. Players meet different factions and have to make decisions that fundamentally change the state of the game's world and how non-playable characters view Aiden. The consequences are far-reaching, with the player being able to bring prosperity to a faction while completely destroying another settlement. Making certain decisions will open up or seal-off areas in the city, encouraging players to complete multiple playthroughs. Like its predecessor, the game features four-player cooperative multiplayer.

Story

Setting
The 2014 zombie outbreak in Harran (depicted in Dying Light) ended with the death of all of the city's citizens, with no reported survivors. The Global Relief Effort (GRE) is able to develop a vaccine for the Harran Virus, ending the threat of the zombie pandemic. Despite promises to cease all research on the virus, the GRE continued experimenting on it in secret for military purposes. In 2021, a mutated variant of the virus named Tachytransmissive Harran Virus (THV) escapes a GRE lab and starts a second pandemic that spreads faster than the first, sweeping across the world in an event called "The Fall". The vaccine and Antizin are ineffective against the new strain of THV, but its effects can be suppressed with ultraviolet light. 

By 2036, fifteen years after the Fall, much of the world's population has been wiped out, human civilization has been reduced to a handful of scattered settlements, with the fictional walled European city of Villedor being one of the largest. Originally quarantined by the GRE, Villedor was spared the worst of the pandemic thanks to its quarantine walls keeping the hordes of infected out of the city. Control of the city is split between several factions, including the militaristic Peacekeepers, the independent Survivors, and the violent Renegades. 

The main protagonist Aiden Caldwell is a Pilgrim, an individual brave enough to make the dangerous trek between human settlements. He decides to travel to Villedor in order to search for his lost sister, Mia.

Plot

Aiden makes his way to the city of Villedor after being notified that there is an informant that knows the whereabouts of Vincent Waltz, a doctor who experimented on Aiden and Mia when they were children, in hopes that Waltz knows Mia's location. Aiden meets the informant, but is bitten by a Volatile and infected. The informant gives Aiden a working GRE electronic key, warning him that if Waltz gets his hands on it, Villedor is doomed. He instructs Aiden to take the key to the "Fish Eye" and hand it to a woman named Lawan. The informant is captured and executed by Waltz while Aiden flees, making his way further into Villedor. 

Aiden makes his way to the Bazaar, one of the main settlements in Villedor. Due to Aiden’s lack of a biomarker, a device which tracks the progress of a person's infection, he is nearly hanged by the Bazaar’s residents but is saved by Hakon, one of the locals. Hakon explains that tensions in Villedor are high due to a Peacekeeper officer, Lucas, having been recently murdered, with the Peacekeepers believing that the survivors of the Bazaar are responsible, risking the outbreak of war between the two factions. Hakon helps Aiden obtain a biomarker and tries to smuggle him into Villedor's Central district, where the Fish Eye is located. Players can choose to side with either the Bazaar's leaders, Carl and Sophie or Aitor, an officer of the Peacekeepers. Both of them promise Aiden that they will smuggle him into the Central District as both sides go to war. 

Regardless of who Aiden sides with, he discovers that Hakon killed Lucas on Waltz's orders. Waltz confronts Aiden, demonstrating superhuman abilities as he steals the GRE key from him. Aiden pursues Waltz to an abandoned car factory, where he uses the key to activate a console before Lawan intervenes, incapacitating Waltz long enough for Aiden to recover the key and escape. Lawan reveals that she was also one of Waltz's test subjects and seeks revenge against him, and that Lucas was murdered by Waltz after originally finding the GRE key. With the key, Aiden and Lawan are able to enter the Central district, where they see electricity suddenly be restored to the city due to Waltz's use of the key. Aiden then meets with the commander of the Peacekeepers, Jack Matt, and the former leader of the now defunct Nightrunner group, Frank. They both task Aiden with reactivating the radio antenna atop Villedor's highest skyscraper so that they can broadcast messages to all of Villedor and the settlements beyond, and in return they can help Aiden with finding a surviving GRE doctor so that he can access the GRE database. 

After reactivating the tower, Aiden learns that the GRE doctor's identity is Dr. Veronika Ryan, a Bazaar resident. Aiden returns to the Bazaar and finds Veronika, who is on the run from the Renegades. Together, they head to a GRE facility called the Observatory, where the GRE database is located. After accessing the database, Aiden does not find any information to help his search for Mia, but discovers that Waltz reactivating Villedor's power plant also reactivated a GRE failsafe protocol calling missile strikes to destroy Villedor. Waltz arrives to take the key, and while fighting him, Aiden loses control of his infection and kills Veronika just as a missile destroys the Observatory and Waltz escapes with the key. 

Lawan pulls Aiden from the debris, and he warns her that Waltz's experiments on him means he will inevitably turn. However, he cannot stop Lawan from going after the leader of the Renegades, Colonel Williams. Williams claims he originally stopped the missile strikes, but Waltz has resumed them. Not wanting to see Villedor destroyed, Williams tells Aiden to head for the X13 lab to confront Waltz and stop the missiles. Aiden and Lawan enter the complex and are shocked to find that X13 was supposed to be a survival shelter for GRE officials, with massive stockpiles of supplies. Lawan rescues Hakon after he tries to protect them from the Renegades, leaving Aiden to continue alone. As he journeys through X13, he realizes it is the same facility where he was experimented on. 

Aiden confronts Waltz, who reveals that Aiden's memories were incorrect, and that Mia is actually Waltz's daughter who he has been trying to cure for the past 15 years. Waltz refuses to abort the missile launches, as that would require shutting down X13, whose facilities are necessary to cure Mia, forcing Aiden to battle him. Aiden finally manages to defeat Waltz, who succumbs to his wounds, but the GRE key is destroyed in the fighting. Lawan then tells Aiden she plans to detonate explosives to destroy the missiles before they can launch, which will destroy X13 and possibly herself. Aiden must choose to either try and save Mia, or save Lawan. 

 If Aiden goes to save Lawan, he takes her out of X13. However, Aiden fails to stop the missile strike, which destroys Villedor and kills a majority of the population. Aiden then leaves the city due to his infection, continuing his journey as a Pilgrim. Depending on the player's choices during the game, Hakon may leave the city with him.
 If Aiden goes to save Mia, he takes her out of X13. X13 is destroyed in the explosion and the city is spared from destruction. Mia dies shortly after due to her weakened condition and is buried by Aiden. Meanwhile, Villedor falls under the control of the faction Aiden supported the most. However, Aiden ultimately decides to leave Villedor due to his infection and continues his journey as a Pilgrim. Depending on the player's choices during the game, Hakon may save Lawan from X13's destruction and Lawan may leave the city with Aiden.

Development 
Dying Light 2 Stay Human is developed and published by Techland. The team intended to invoke a sense of loss and dread. They also show that humanity was on the edge of extinction. To show the fragility of humanity, the team introduced several layers to the City, in which the temporary structures are built on top of the ruins of the old buildings to accommodate humans, whereas permanent structures and concrete ground are occupied by massive hordes of zombies. When creating the city, the team utilized an internal technology named CityBuilder, which can assemble different building parts like ledges and windows with minimal input from the level designers. The technology enabled the team to create and change the city design quickly. The team created a new engine named C-Engine to power the game.

The game placed a significantly larger emphasis on narrative when compared with its predecessor. The team approached Chris Avellone to help write the game's story which is reactive to players' choices. The team felt that they had developed an open city, but they wanted the narrative to share the same level of agency. The game was described as a "narrative sandbox" in which every choice has "genuine" consequences according to Avellone. After players make certain choices, the game space will change. The game's story features a more serious tone when compared with the first game. To make the world feel believable and authentic, the team took inspiration from real-world issues and political ideologies and had to drop gameplay ideas that were deemed too unrealistic. Ciszewski added that in each playthrough, players will "lose at least 25 percent of the content".

The story focuses on a new, modern "Dark Ages" for humanity, which enables the story to convey themes such as betrayal, infidelity, and intrigue. The team was confident about the game's gameplay, though they felt that they needed additional help when designing the game's narrative. Therefore, the team recruited Avellone as well as writers who worked on The Witcher 3: Wild Hunt, a game widely praised for its writing and story. The narrative design prompts players to care about the non-playable characters and encourages players to be more sensitive about their presence and needs. Zombies, instead of being the main enemy like in the last game, become a narrative device that pressurize other non-playable characters to induce interesting drama and themes. The game features hostile human enemies more heavily when compared with the first game, as the team was inspired by works including The Walking Dead and Game of Thrones, in which living humans are equally dangerous. The team developed a life cycle for zombies in the game. Newly bitten zombies are called Viral, which are fast and dangerous enemies whose humanity still remain. They would become Biters, which are described as "regular zombies". When Biters are exposed to UV light for a long period of time, they devolved into Degenerates, which are degenerating zombies with flesh falling off from them.

Due to sexual misconduct allegations made against Chris Avellone in June 2020, Techland and Avellone agreed to terminate his involvement with Dying Light 2. He has since filed a libel lawsuit and denied sexual misconduct of any kind calling the allegations malicious and false.

Release
The game was announced at E3 2018 during the Xbox press conference by Avellone as Dying Light 2. Square Enix distributes the game and provided marketing efforts in North America. On January 20, 2020, Techland announced that the game would be delayed out of its early 2020 window to allow additional development time, with no new release date given at the time. On May 27, 2021, a digital event was held and a December 7, 2021 release date was revealed, alongside the game's title adding the subtitle of Stay Human. Along with the release date, a promotional comic detailing the apocalypse and showcasing a new variant infected was released digitally with a physical release coming in Q4 2021. The game was delayed to February 4, 2022. The comic received mixed reviews, with praise directed towards the art and criticism aimed at the story and characters. On September 23, 2021, a cloud version of Dying Light 2 Stay Human was confirmed for the Nintendo Switch console during a Nintendo Direct presentation, set to release on the same day as the other platforms. This version of the game was delayed and Techland announced that it would be released "within six months" after its initial launch on other platforms.

Techland promised to support the game with downloadable content and updates for at least five years after the game's launch. A New Game Plus mode was added in April 2022. The first story downloadable content, Bloody Ties, which introduced a Roman gladiator-style arena, was released on November 19, 2022.

Reception

Critical reception 

Dying Light 2 Stay Human received "generally favorable" reviews, according to review aggregator Metacritic.

Kotaku praised the parkour system, writing that it expanded upon its predecessor in meaningful ways, "Dying Light 2 feels as if Techland realized how the first game's movement made it stand out from so many other zombie games, and focused on building it up more. The end result is one of the best parkour systems I've ever seen in a game". Ars Technica criticized the story, specifically the voice acting and writing, "[Dying Light 2]s voice acting is perhaps the worst I've heard in a video game of this scale... And they're chained to a script that consists of awkwardly translated phrases, along with massive leaps in logic and wartime strategy". While criticizing the narrative's exposition-heavy dialogue, Polygon enjoyed the melee combat, saying that "With a smartly balanced fatigue meter governing attacks and movements, Dying Light 2 makes me think about, and use, all the tactics available to me, especially in boss and sub-boss fights". Eurogamer liked how the open world integrated with the parkour gameplay, "The first-person parkour is simply brilliant, its integration into a vast, dense open world simply astonishing, and the act of getting from A to B is an absolute thrill". Rock Paper Shotgun felt the changes to nightime made it less dangerous and more routine "Come night, you simply avoid the horde by sticking to the rooftops... Interiors are barebones stealth sections, with all too obvious routes to sneak by sleepers... The end result is that you spend a lot of the game being shepherded towards the least interesting place at any given time".

A 'day-one' patch was released along with the digital version of the game, which fixes more than 1000 known issues with the game.

Sales 
The retail version of the game debuted at No. 2 on the UK boxed chart, only behind Pokémon Legends: Arceus. It had a strong launch on Steam, with its all-time player peak count being nearly four times more than the first game 24 hours after the game's release. According to the NPD Group, the physical version of the game was also the fourth best-selling video game in the US in February 2022. The game attracted 3 million players during its first week of release. In February 2022, the game sold 5 million units.

The PlayStation 4 version of Dying Light 2 was the second bestselling retail game during its first week of release in Japan, with 24,160 physical copies being sold. The PlayStation 5 version sold 12,891 physical copies in Japan throughout the same week, making it the fourth bestselling retail game of the week in the country.

References

External links
 

2022 video games
Action role-playing video games
Cloud-based Nintendo Switch games
Fiction set in 2036
Multiplayer and single-player video games
Mutants in fiction
Nintendo Switch games
Open-world video games
Parkour video games
PlayStation 4 games
PlayStation 4 Pro enhanced games
PlayStation 5 games
Post-apocalyptic video games
Survival horror video games
Techland games
Video game sequels
Video games about viral outbreaks
Video games about zombies
Video games developed in Poland
Video games scored by Olivier Deriviere
Video games set in Europe
Video games set in the 2030s
Video games with alternate endings
Windows games
Xbox Cloud Gaming games
Xbox One games
Xbox One X enhanced games
Xbox Series X and Series S games